Ieva Ilves (née Ieva Kupče; born September 13, 1977) is a former First Lady of Estonia, diplomat and cyber security policy expert. Ilves ran as a Latvian candidate for the 2019 European Parliament election. She was the third place candidate for Development/For!, second on the list was Baiba Rubesa, the former CEO of Rail Baltica.

She has worked as the head of unit for National Cyber Security Policy and Political Advisor to the State Secretary at the Ministry of Defence of Latvia. She is founding member of different non-governmental organizations institutions focusing on the issues of security, democracy, and human rights. In 2016 she served as First Lady of Estonia, until her husband Toomas Hendrik Ilves was succeeded by Kersti Kaljulaid in October 2016.

Education 
She studied at the University of Latvia and received a master's degree in Political Science. In 2012 Ilves attended Johns Hopkins University in Washington DC.

Civil service career 
In the late 1990s Ilves was part of the Ministry of Foreign Affairs of the Republic of Latvia team that worked on Latvia's goal to join NATO. After successful accession she continued her work in the field of security policy and democracy sharing Latvia's experience and lessons learned with its Eastern neighbors - Ukraine, Belarus, and Georgia. In 2005-2006 Ilves joined the Riga NATO Summit Task Force and led the local and NATO Public Diplomacy efforts for the NATO Summit 2006 in Riga. Ilves has received a State Award for her contribution to the NATO Summit in Riga, a Recognition of Foreign minister for developing the cooperation with NGOs and the promotion of democracy issues and Memorial Medal of the Minister of Defense for Advancing Latvia's Membership to NATO.

From 2007 to 2010 Ilves was posted to the Latvian Delegation to NATO and from 2010 to 2011 she was seconded to the European Union as a Political Advisor to the EU Special Representative in the South Caucasus in Baku, Azerbaijan focusing on human rights among other topics. Ilves has also worked as Advisor to the State Secretary of the Ministry of Defense having responsibility to establish the NATO STRATCOM COE in Riga and coordinate national cyber security policy, including during the Latvia's Presidency in EU.

In 2012 Ilves and the former US ambassador to NATO Kurt Volker, co-edited the book: “Nordic-Baltic-American Cooperation: Shaping the U.S.-European Agenda”.

NGO work 
In 2000 she was a founding member of the Latvian Transatlantic Organization. She is also a Founding Member and Chairperson of the “Open Belarus” Board of non-governmental organization in Latvia, founded 2004. Open Belarus extended Latvia's policy and activities towards the support of democratic developments in Belarus. In 2008 she was a founding member of the regional non-governmental organization "Baltic to Black Sea Alliance".

First Lady of Estonia (2016) 
In 2016 she married the then president of Estonia Toomas Hendrik Ilves and undertook the responsibilities of the First Lady of Estonia. As the First Lady of Estonia she accompanied her spouse in numerous foreign visits including the 71st Session of the UN General Assembly where she met with the former president of U.S Barack Obama and First Lady Michelle Obama.

Personal life 
She has three children: Ralfs (b. 2002) and Isabella (b. 2014) and Hans Hendrik Ilves (b. 2016).

References

External links

|-

1977 births
Living people
20th-century Latvian people
Johns Hopkins University alumni
Spouses of presidents of Estonia